The 2008–09 Pacific-10 Conference men's basketball season ended with six teams participating in the 2009 NCAA Men's Division I Basketball Tournament and two teams playing in the College Basketball Invitational (CBI).

The Washington Huskies won the regular season championship and its head coach Lorenzo Romar was named coach of the year.

Only three teams, Washington (#14), UCLA (#17) and Arizona State (#19), finished the season in the ESPN/USA Today Coaches Poll. They were #15, #18, and #19 respectively in the "AP Top 25" polls. However, in the final post-NCAA tournament coaches' poll, Arizona was also ranked, coming in at #24, behind Washington (#16), UCLA (#18) and Arizona State (#19).

Pre-season

Mike Montgomery, who was previously the head coach of the Stanford Cardinal, came back to college coaching with the California Golden Bears.  Craig Robinson, President Barack Obama's brother-in-law, became the head coach of the Oregon State. Lute Olson retired from Arizona and Russ Pennell took over.

Pac-10 teams participated in the Pac-10/Big 12 Series. They also took part in other x-season tournament games, including the 2K Sports Classic, and the John R. Wooden Classic in the Honda Center. Oregon Ducks played in the Maui Invitational Tournament and Washington State Cougars were there at the Legends Classic.

Conference games

Washington was first in scoring offense and rebounding offense, while Washington State was first in scoring defense and free throw percentage in conference games. UCLA was on top in scoring margin, field goal percentage and 3-point field goal percentage.

Arizona led the conference in attendance with a total of 232,576 in 17 games, averaging 13,681 (14,545 capacity).

Conference tournament

USC, the #6 seed team, won the 2009 Pacific Life Pacific-10 Conference men's basketball tournament at the Staples Center in Los Angeles, California on March 14, in front of a crowd of 16,988. The team defeated #4 seed Arizona State and won the school's first tournament championship. It was also the first time a team seeded sixth in the tournament went on to win the championship. The Trojans received the conference's automatic bid to the NCAA National Tournament.

Postseason
Six Pac-10 teams participated in the 2009 NCAA Men's Division I Basketball Tournament. Five teams won their first round games, but only Arizona played in the regional semi-finals. The Wildcats lost to Louisville 103–64.

Oregon State and Stanford played in the College Basketball Invitational (CBI). Oregon State defeated Stanford (65–62) in over-time in the semi-finals and played UTEP for the championship in a best of three-game series. Oregon State won the CBI title by winning the first and third games over UTEP.

Highlights and notes

At the end of March 2009, Washington State head coach Tony Bennett announced that he was leaving Washington State to take the head coaching job at Virginia. Ken Bone, formerly with Portland State, takes over.

On March 31, 2009, UCLA's senior point guard Darren Collison was named the 2009 recipient of the Frances Pomeroy Naismith Award by the Naismith Memorial Basketball Hall of Fame. The award goes to the "nation's outstanding senior male collegian 6'0" and under who has excelled both athletically and academically."

Russ Pennell left Arizona after a year coaching one of the country's premiere basketball programs. He coached the Wildcats to the Sweet 16, where the team lost the final game to Louisville, 103–64. USC's Tim Floyd went to Tucson for an interview of the Arizona job, but he decided to remain at USC. Sean Miller, former Xavier coach, accepted the job on April 6.

The conference set a new attendance record with 8,541 per game, beating the 2007 record of 8,524.

Awards and honors

All-Americans

James Harden (SG, Sophomore), of Arizona State was named to the 2009 Consensus All-America first team. He was listed on the Associated Press, the USBWA, and the Sporting News All-American lists to qualify for the "Consensus All-America".

The following players from Pac-10 were honored on the AP All American list:

First Team (Player, School, Ht, Wt, Yr, Key stats)
 James Harden, Arizona State, 6–5, 218, So., 20.8 ppg, 5.5 rpg, 4.2 apg, 35.8 min., 50.2 fg pct (45, 290)
 
Honorable mention (Player, School)
 Jon Brockman, Washington
 Chase Budinger, Arizona
 Darren Collison, UCLA
 Jordan Hill, Arizona

All-Pac-10 teams

Regular season honors: 
 Player of The Year: James Harden, Arizona State
 Freshman of The Year: Isaiah Thomas, Washington
 Defensive Player of The Year: Taj Gibson, USC
 Most Improved Player of The Year: Justin Dentmon, Washington
 Coach of The Year: Lorenzo Romar, Washington

First team 

(Name, School, Pos, Yr, Ht, Wt, Hometown (Last School))
 Jon Brockman, WASH, F, Sr., 6–7, 255, Snohomish, Wash. (Snohomish HS)
 Chase Budinger, ARIZ, F, Jr., 6–7, 218, Encinitas, Calif. (LaCosta Canyon HS)
 Patrick Christopher, CAL, G, Jr., 6–5, 215, Compton, Calif. (Dominguez HS)
 Darren Collison, UCLA, G, Sr., 6–0, 160, Rancho Cucamonga, Calif. (Etiwanda HS)
 Justin Dentmon, WASH, G, Sr., 5–11, 185, Carbondale, Ill. (The Winchendon School, Mass.)
 James Harden, ASU, G, So., 6–5, 218, Los Angeles, Calif. (Artesia HS)
 Jordan Hill, ARIZ, F, Jr., 6–10, 235, Atlanta, Ga. (The Patterson School, N.C.)
 Jeff Pendergraph, ASU, F, Sr., 6–9, 240, Etiwanda, Calif. (Etiwanda HS)
 Jerome Randle, CAL, G, Jr., 5–10, 160, Chicago, Ill. (Hales Franciscan HS)
 Taylor Rochestie, WSU, G, Sr., 6–1, 186, Santa Barbara, Calif. (Tulane)

All-Academic

The 2008–09 Pacific-10 Conference Men's Basketball All-Academic teams (minimum 3.0 overall grade-point average and be either a starter or significant contributor):

First Team (School, Year, GPA, Major)
 Aron Baynes, WSU, Sr., 3.24,	Movement Studies
 Derek Glasser, ASU, Jr., 3.14, Communications
 Daven Harmeling, WSU, Sr., 3.54, Health and Fitness Education
 Nikola Koprivica, WSU, Jr., 3.39, International Business
 Taylor Rochestie, WSU, Sr., 3.37, Communication

Second Team (School, Year, GPA, Major)
 Nikola Knezevic, CAL, Jr., 3.03, Interdisciplinary Studies
 Rihards Kuksiks, ASU, So., 3.07, Business Communications
 Roeland Schaftenaar, OSU, Jr., 3.17, Pre-Business
 Drew Shiller, STAN, Jr., 3.08, Communication
 Jordan Wilkes, CAL, Sr., 3.13, Social Welfare

Taylor Rochestie, of Washington State, was named a Pacific-10 Conference winter Scholar-Athletes of the Year.

USBWA All-District team

The U.S. Basketball Writers Association's 2008–09 Men's All-District Teams (District IX: CA, OR, WA, HI, AZ, AK):

 Player of the year – James Harden, Arizona State
 Coach of the year – Craig Robinson, Oregon State
 All-District Team: 
 James Harden, Arizona State
 Jon Brockman, Washington
 Darren Collison, UCLA
 Patrick Christopher, California
 Jordan Hill, Arizona
 Jerome Randle, California
 Chase Budinger, Arizona

References